Howatharra is a small town in the Mid West region of Western Australia, between Geraldton and Binnu. It is situated just off the North West Coastal Highway and on the Oakagee River.

The town was originally a railway siding on the Northampton railway line that was established in 1908 after the surrounding land was opened up for agriculture in the early 1900s. Initially the town was known as Howatharra and also Webb's Siding and was gazetted as the former in 1909.

The town's name is Aboriginal in origin, and is the local name for a nearby spring.

References 

Towns in Western Australia
Mid West (Western Australia)